Pamela Asibie Cookey (born 2 September 1984 in Birmingham, West Midlands) is a former English netball player who mostly played at goal attack (GA).

Club career
In domestic netball, Cookey has played with Team Bath in the Netball Superleague since the competition's inception in 2005, winning two titles in 2005–06 and 2008–09. She also played in the Australasian ANZ Championship in 2009, signing with New Zealand franchise the Northern Mystics.
Pam was announced as a Surrey Storm player joining ahead of the 2015 Super League season. This could see the playing partnership with Tamsin Greenway return once again.

International career
Cookey was a surprise inclusion in the England national netball team as a seventeen-year-old, for the 2002 Commonwealth Games in Manchester, but was unable to participate due to a knee injury. She was also named in the team the following year, but withdrew due to study commitments at the University of Bath.

She made her senior debut with England in 2004 against Australia, and two years later won a bronze medal with the England team at the 2006 Commonwealth Games. She won a second Commonwealth Games bronze medal in 2010, and later that year won silver at the World Netball Series.

Personal life
Cookey was UK Soft Services (buildings facilities management) manager for the Airbus UK site in Filton, Bristol.

References

External links
 England Netball Association

1984 births
Living people
Sportspeople from Birmingham, West Midlands
Alumni of the University of Bath
Northern Mystics players
ANZ Championship players
Team Bath netball players
English netball players
Black British sportswomen
Commonwealth Games bronze medallists for England
Netball players at the 2006 Commonwealth Games
Netball players at the 2010 Commonwealth Games
Commonwealth Games medallists in netball
Netball Superleague players
Surrey Storm players
AENA Super Cup players
English expatriate netball people in New Zealand
2011 World Netball Championships players
2015 Netball World Cup players
Medallists at the 2006 Commonwealth Games
Medallists at the 2010 Commonwealth Games